Samouni Road  is a 2018 Italian documentary film directed by Stefano Savona. The film uses a combination of live action, scratchboard animation and drone footage recreations. It was selected to screen in the Directors' Fortnight section at the 2018 Cannes Film Festival and won the Œil d'or prize for best documentary.

References

External links
 

2018 documentary films
2018 animated films
2018 films
Italian documentary films
Italian animated films
2010s Italian-language films
2010s Italian films